Ohio is a U.S State.

Ohio may also refer to:

Places

Canada
Ohio, Antigonish County
Ohio, Digby, Nova Scotia
Ohio, Shelburne, Nova Scotia, in the District of Shelbourne
Ohio, Yarmouth, Nova Scotia

United States
 Ohio City, Colorado
 Ohio City, Ohio, a village in Van Wert County
 Ohio City, Cleveland, a neighborhood of Cleveland, Ohio
 Ohio, Illinois, a village
 Ohio, Kansas, a ghost town
 Ohio, Missouri, an unincorporated community
 Ohio, New York, a town
 Ohio, Texas, an unincorporated community
 Ohio County (disambiguation)
 Ohio Country, a historical region in North America
 Ohio Township (disambiguation)
 Ohio River, a tributary of the Mississippi River
 Ohio River Valley AVA, wine region along the Ohio River
 Ohio State University, a university in Columbus, Ohio
 Ohio Territory (disambiguation)
 Ohio University, a university in Athens, Ohio

Music
 Ohio (Over the Rhine album), 2003
 Ohio (Stalley album), 2014
 "Ohio" (1953 song), a song from the musical Wonderful Town
 "Ohio" (Crosby, Stills, Nash & Young song)
 "Ohio (Come Back to Texas)", a song by Bowling for Soup
 "Ohio", a song by Damien Jurado from Rehearsals for Departure
 "Ohio", a song by Modest Mouse from This Is a Long Drive for Someone with Nothing to Think About
 "Ohio", a song by The Black Keys from Brothers
 "Ohio", a song by Utah Saints
 "Ohio", a song by Justice from Audio, Video, Disco
 "Ohio", a song by Isabelle Adjani, from Pull marine
 "Ohio", a song by The Presidents of the United States of America from Kudos to You!
 "Swag Like Ohio", a song by Lil B
 "Only in Ohio", a song by CG5

Ships
 , nuclear-powered ballistic missile submarines operated by the United States Navy
 List of ships named SS Ohio

Other
Ohio, a 2018 novel by Stephen Markley
 439 Ohio, an asteroid

See also
 Ohio Theatre (disambiguation)
 
 Ohayo (disambiguation)